L'Alba was an Italian-language fascist weekly newspaper published in Tunis, Tunisia. It was founded by Giuseppe Colombo and R. A. Oliva, with the first issue published on 5 September 1935.

Regarding the war against Ethiopia, l'Alba boasted of having two companies of blackshirts from Tunisia, "Numidie" and "Zama", at the battle-fields. The publication attacked freemasons and anti-fascists, while appealing to Italians to buy products from their own nation. The British consulate found the diatribes in l'Alba insulting to Great Britain and Malta, and lodged a formal complaint against the publication. It was subsequently shut down by French colonial authorities - with the last issue published on 14 November 1935.

See also 

Italian Tunisians

References

1935 establishments in Tunisia
1935 disestablishments in Tunisia
Defunct newspapers published in Tunisia
Fascism in Africa
Fascism in the Arab world
Fascist newspapers and magazines
Italian language newspapers published in Tunisia
Mass media in Tunis
Newspapers established in 1935
Publications disestablished in 1935